Asian television awards may refer to:

 Asian Television Awards, a set of awards given in Malaysia each year for the Asian television industry
 List of Asian television awards, a list of awards for television in Asia